Steve Parr (22 December 1926 – 6 August 2019) was an English footballer who played as a defender.

External links
 LFC History profile

References

1926 births
2019 deaths
English footballers
Liverpool F.C. players
Exeter City F.C. players
Rochdale A.F.C. players
Burscough F.C. players
Association football defenders
Footballers from Preston, Lancashire